is a Japanese actress, TV personality, and model. She has a younger sister, Suzu Hirose, who is also a model and actress.

Appearances

TV dramas
 Geki Koi: Unmei no Love Story (NHK, 2010), Kaho Hisanaga
 Asu no Hikari o Tsukame (Tōkai TV, 2010), Haruka Sawaguchi
You Taught Me All the Precious Things (Fuji TV, 2011), Ryōko Kagawa
 Shin Anata no Shiranai Sekai (NTV, 2011)
 Hōkago wa Mystery to Tomo ni (TBS, 2012), Naoko Takabayashi
 Answer: Keishichō Kenshō Sōsakan Episode 3 (TV Asahi, 2012), Rio Yamane
 Miss Double Faced Teacher (TBS, 2012), Eika Saeki
 AIBOU: Tokyo Detective Duo: Season 11 Episode 11 (TV Asahi, 2013), Ruriko Tachibana
 Tada's Do-It-All House  Episode 5 (TV Tokyo, 2013)
 No Dropping Out: Back to School at 35 (NTV, 2013), Rina Hasegawa
 Jikenya Kagyō (Fuji TV, 2013), Kaori Kawashima
 Roosevelt Game (TBS, 2014), Misato Yamazaki
 We Are Already Dead (TBS, 2014), Rin Akatsuki
 Honto ni Atta Kowai Hanashi 15-shūnen Special (Fuji TV, 2014)
 Tamagawa Kuyakusho of the Dead (TV Tokyo, 2014), Rin Tachibana
 Sachi to Mayu (NHK, 2015), Mayu
 Mōsō kanojo (Fuji TV, 2015), Haru
 Laugh It Up! (NHK, Asadora, 2017–18), Ririko Hatano
 7 Secretaries (TV Asahi, 2020), Nana Terui
 Radiation House (Fuji TV, 2019–2021), Hirono Hirose
 Top Knife (NTV, 2020)
 Super Radical Gag Family Episode 4 (TV Tokyo, 2020), Nanako Nagasakiya
 What Will You Do, Ieyasu? (NHK, 2023), Lady Oai

Films
 Shinizokonai no Ao (2008)
 Renai Yakusoku (2008, direct-to-video film)
 Kamen Rider × Kamen Rider W & Decade: Movie War 2010 (2009)
 Subete wa Umi ni Naru (2010)
 Maria-sama ga Miteru (2010), Tsutako Takeshima
 Lost Harmony (2011), Sanae Miyata
 Soup: Umarekawari no Monogatari (2012), Hitomi Misaki
 Zekkyō Gakkyū (2013), Rio Takamizawa
 Silver Spoon (2014), Aki Mikage
 Flare (2014)
 Seiro no Umi Tantei Mitarai no Jikenbo (2016), Miyuki Ogawa
 Chihayafuru: Kami no Ku (2016), Chihaya's sister (cameo)
 Unrequited Love (2016), Nozomi
 L (2016), L
 Shinjuku Swan II (2017), Mayumi Ozawa
 Hyouka: Forbidden Secrets (2017), Eru Chitanda
 Miko-Girl (2018), Shiwasu
 Eating Women (2018), Akari
 The Gun (2018), Yūko Yoshikawa
 The Travelling Cat Chronicles (2018), Chikako
 Doraemon: Nobita's Chronicle of the Moon Exploration (2019), Luna (voice)
 AI Amok (2020), Kumi Okuse
 Silent Tokyo (2020), Manami Takanashi
 Jigoku no Hanazono: Office Royale (2021), Ran
 Bubble (2022), Makoto (voice)
 Radiation House: The Movie (2022), Hirono Hirose
 7 Secretaries: The Movie (2022), Nana Terui

Commercials
 Takamiya Gakuen - Yoyogi Seminar (2009-2010)
 Tomy - Love Digi Series (2009-2010)
 Shizuoka Prefecture - Depression and suicide prevention (2010)
 Lotte - Cool Mint Gum (2010-)
 Nissin Foods - Nissin Yakisoba U.F.O. (2011)
 Akagi Nyūgyō - Gatsun, to Mikan (2012)
 Otsuka Foods - Vitamin Carbonated Drink Match (2014-) with Suzu Hirose
 Hoya Corporation - Eyecity (2014)
 Nivea Kaō - 8x4 Deo Water (2015)
 USJ - Resident Evil The Real 3 (2015)
 Arome Bakery

DubbingPower Rangers (2017), Kimberly Hart/Pink Ranger (Naomi Scott)

Bibliography

Magazines
 Seventeen, Shueisha 1967-, as an exclusive model since 2009

Photobook
 aBUTTON Vol.2 (27 September 2011) 
 Alice'' (16 March 2014)

Accolades

References

External links

  
 
 

1994 births
Japanese film actresses
Japanese television actresses
Japanese television personalities
Japanese female models
Japanese gravure models
Living people
People from Shizuoka (city)
21st-century Japanese actresses
Japanese child actresses